Autoclaved aerated concrete (AAC) is a lightweight, precast, foam concrete building material suitable for producing concrete masonry unit like blocks.  Composed of  quartz sand (SiO2 with impurities), calcined calcium sulfate (CaSO4, a.k.a. plaster of paris), lime (CaO), cement, water and aluminum powder, AAC products are cured under heat and pressure in an autoclave. Invented in the mid-1920s, AAC simultaneously provides structure, insulation, and fire- and mold-resistance. Forms include blocks, wall panels, floor and roof panels, cladding (façade) panels and lintels.

AAC products may be used for both interior and exterior construction, and may be painted or coated with a stucco or plaster compound to guard against the elements, or covered with siding materials such as veneer brick or vinyl siding. In addition to their quick and easy installation, AAC materials can be routed, sanded, or cut to size on site using standard power tools with carbon steel cutters. The Reinforced Steel Version is known as RAAC which has a limited life span of 30 to 40 years at which stage, it is known to become structurally unstable.

Etymology
Other names for the product include autoclaved cellular concrete (ACC), autoclaved concrete, cellular concrete, porous concrete, Aircrete, Thermalite, Hebel Block, Aercon, Starken, Gasbeton, Airbeton, Siporex, and Ytong.

History
AAC was perfected in the mid-1920s by the Swedish architect and inventor Dr. Johan Axel Eriksson, working with Professor Henrik Kreüger at the Royal Institute of Technology. The process was patented in 1924. In 1929, production started in Sweden at the city of Yxhult. From "Yxhults Ånghärdade Gasbetong" later became the first registered building materials brand in the world:  Ytong. Another brand “Siporex” was established in Sweden in 1939 and presently licences and owns plants in 35 locations around the world. The second major international cellular concrete Hebel brand goes back to company founder and technician Josef Hebel from Memmingen. In 1943, the first Hebel-plant was opened in Germany.

Originally Ytong autoclaved aerated concrete in Sweden was produced with alum shale, whose combustible carbon content was beneficial in the production process. Unfortunately, the slate deposits used for Ytong in Sweden also contain a very low level of natural uranium, which makes the material give off radioactive radon gas in the building. In 1972, the Swedish Radiation Safety Authority pointed out the unsuitability of a radon-emitting construction material, and the use of alum slate in the production of Ytong ceased in 1975. By using new formulations, containing only quartz sand, calcined gypsum, lime (mineral), cement, water and aluminum powder, Ytong produced a new type of aerated concrete which no longer contains alum slate and thus has eliminated the problem of radon exposure from this raw material. The production of this white autoclaved aerated concrete is now state of the art and similar formulations are used by all producers around the world.

In 1978 The Swedish team of Siporex Sweden opened the Siporex Factory in the Kingdom of Saudi Arabia  - the "Lightweight Construction Company - Siporex - LCC SIPOREX"  which have supplied the Middle-East and Africa and Japan by most of its need. The LCC Siporex Factory has operated for more than 40 years. Today aerated concrete is produced by many companies, particularly in Europe and Asia. There is some production in the Americas and in Africa, there is one plant in Egypt. AAC production in Europe has slowed down considerably, but the industry is growing rapidly in Asia due to strong demand in housing and commercial space. China is now the largest aircrete market in the world with several hundred factories. China, Central Asia, India, and the Middle-East are the biggest in terms of AAC manufacturing and consumption.

The product aircrete is sold, like other masonry materials, under many different brand names. Ytong and Hebel are brands of the international operating company Xella headquartered in Duisburg. Other more internationally renowned brand names in Europe are H + H Celcon (Denmark), or Solbet (Poland).

Uses
AAC is a concrete-based material used for both interior and exterior construction. One of its advantages is quick and easy installation, because the material can be routed, sanded, or cut to size on-site using standard power tools with carbon steel cutters.

AAC is well suited for high-rise buildings and those with high-temperature variations. Due to its lower density, high-rise buildings constructed using AAC require less steel and concrete for structural members. The mortar needed for the laying AAC blocks is reduced due to the lower number of joints. Similarly, the material required for rendering is also lower due to the dimensional accuracy of AAC. The increased thermal efficiency of AAC makes it suitable for use in areas with extreme temperatures, as it eliminates the need for separate materials for construction and insulation, leading to faster construction and cost savings.

AAC materials can be coated with a stucco or plaster compound to guard against the elements, or covered with siding materials such as brick or vinyl.

Manufacturing
Unlike most other concrete applications, AAC is produced using no aggregate larger than sand. Quartz sand (SiO2), calcined gypsum, lime (mineral) and/or cement and water are used as a binding agent. Aluminum powder is used at a rate of 0.05%–0.08% by volume (depending on the pre-specified density). In some countries, like India and China, fly ash generated from coal-fired power plants, and having 50–65% silica content, is used as an aggregate.

When AAC is mixed and cast in forms, several chemical reactions take place that gives AAC its light weight (20% of the weight of concrete) and thermal properties. Aluminum powder reacts with calcium hydroxide and water to form hydrogen. At the end of the foaming process, the hydrogen escapes into the atmosphere and is replaced by air.

When the forms are removed from the material, it is solid but still soft. It is then cut into either blocks or panels, and placed in an autoclave chamber for 12 hours. During this steam pressure hardening process, when the temperature reaches  and the pressure reaches , quartz sand reacts with calcium hydroxide to form calcium silicate hydrate, which gives AAC its high strength and other unique properties. Because of the relatively low temperature used, AAC blocks are not considered to be a fired brick but a lightweight concrete masonry unit. After the autoclaving process, the material is ready for immediate use on the construction site. Depending on its density, up to 80% of the volume of an AAC block is air. AAC's low density also accounts for its low structural compression strength.

In 1978, the first AAC material factory - the LCC Siporex- Lightweight Construction Company - was opened in the Persian Gulf state of Saudi Arabia, supplying Gulf Cooperation Council countries with aerated blocks and panels.

Since 1980, there has been a worldwide increase in the use of AAC materials. New production plants are being built in Australia, Bahrain, China, Eastern Europe, India and the United States. AAC is increasingly used worldwide by developers.

Eco-friendliness 
The high resource efficiency of autoclaved aerated concrete ensures its low environmental impact at all stages of its life cycle, from raw material processing to the disposal of aerated concrete waste. Due to continuous improvements in efficiency, the production of aerated concrete blocks requires relatively little raw materials per m3 of product and is five times less than the production of other building materials. There is no loss of raw materials in the production process, and all production waste is returned to the production cycle. Production of aerated concrete requires less energy than for all other masonry products, thereby reducing the use of fossil fuels and associated carbon dioxide emissions. The curing process also saves energy, as the steam curing takes place at relatively low temperatures and the hot steam generated in the autoclaves is reused for subsequent batches.

Advantages
AAC has been produced for more than 70 years, and it offers several advantages over other cement construction materials, one of the most important being its lower environmental impact.
 Improved thermal efficiency reduces the heating and cooling load in buildings.
 Porous structure gives superior fire resistance.
 Workability allows accurate cutting, which minimizes the generation of solid waste during use.
 Resource efficiency gives it lower environmental impact in all phases of its life cycle, from the processing of raw materials to the disposal of waste.
 Lightweight saves cost and energy in transportation, labour expenses, and increases chances of survival during seismic activity.
 Larger size blocks leads to faster masonry work.
 Reduces project cost for large constructions.
Environmentally friendly:  It produces at least 30% less solid waste than traditional concrete. There is a decrease of 50% of greenhouse gas emissions.
 Due to less weight the blocks can be handled easily
Fire resistant:  As with regular concrete, AAC is fire resistant.
Great ventilation:  This material is very airy and allows diffusion of water. This reduces the humidity inside the building. AAC will absorb moisture and release humidity. This helps to prevent condensation and other problems that are related to mildew.
Non-toxic:  There are no toxic gases or other toxic substances in autoclaved aerated concrete. It neither attracts rodents or other pests nor can it be damaged by such.
Accuracy:  The panels and blocks made of autoclaved aerated concrete are produced to the exact sizes needed before leaving the factory. There is less need for on-site trimming. Since the blocks and panels fit so well together, there is less use of finishing materials such as mortar.
Long lasting:  The life of this material is extended because it is not affected by harsh climates or extreme weather changes. It will not degrade under normal climate changes.

Disadvantages
AAC has been produced for more than 70 years, however, some disadvantages were found when it was introduced in the UK (where cavity wall with clay brick two-skin construction has been the norm). 
Installation during rainy weather: AAC is known to crack after installation, which can be avoided by reducing the strength of the mortar and ensuring the blocks are dry during and after installation.  This may also be a problem in environments with high humidity.
Brittle nature: they need to be handled more carefully than clay bricks to avoid breakage.
Attachments: the brittle nature of the blocks requires longer, thinner screws when fitting cabinets and wall hangings. Special, large diameter wall plugs (anchors) are available at a higher cost than common wall plugs.
Insulation requirements in newer building codes of northern European countries would require very thick walls when using AAC alone. Thus many builders choose to use traditional building methods installing an extra layer of insulation around the entire building.
As with other concrete products, the carbon footprint of manufacturing and transporting can be high, and should be considered when comparing to other building products.

References

External links
 
 History of Autoclaved Aerated Concrete
 Using Autoclaved Aerated Concrete Correctly - Masonry Magazine, June 2008
 Aircrete Products Association
 Autoclaved Aerated Concrete - Portland Cement Association

Building materials
Concrete
Masonry
Swedish inventions